The 2017 Syracuse Orange football team represented Syracuse University during the 2017 NCAA Division I FBS football season. The Orange were led by second-year head coach Dino Babers and played their home games at the Carrier Dome. They competed as members of the Atlantic Division of the Atlantic Coast Conference, finishing in last place with a final record of 4–8 (2–6 ACC).

Schedule

Game summaries

Central Connecticut

Middle Tennessee

Central Michigan

at LSU

at NC State

Pittsburgh

Clemson

at Miami (FL)

at Florida State

Wake Forest

at Louisville

Boston College

2018 NFL Draft

References

Syracuse
Syracuse Orange football seasons
Syracuse Orange football